Reza Oghabi (born 5 June 1953 in Saveh) is a retired Iranian football player and now coach.

Honours

Player

Country 
 Asian Cup Winners' Cup
 Runners-up (1): 1992–93 (Persepolis)

Club 
 Azadegan
 Champion (1): 2002–03 (Shamoushak)
 Runners-up (1): 1992–93 {Persepolis}
 Falagh Cup
 Champion (1): Saveh
 Armed forces Cup
 Champion (1): Oghab

Individual 
 Top Goalscorer:
 Armed forces Cup: Oghab
 Tehran Football League: Bank Sepah (13)
 Azadegan: Shamoushak

Manager 
 Iran Futsal's 1st Division
 Champion (1): 2010–11 (Shahrdari Saveh)
 Iran Futsal's 2nd Division
 Champion (1): 2007 (Saveh Shan)
 Markazi Province League
 Champion (1): Tarbiat Badani Saveh

References 

Iranian footballers
Iranian futsal coaches
Association football forwards
1953 births
Living people
Persepolis F.C. players
Shamoushak Noshahr players
Sepahan S.C. footballers
Fajr Sepasi players
Machine Sazi F.C. players
People from Saveh